Suwannakhuha is the northernmost district (amphoe) of Nong Bua Lamphu province, northeastern Thailand.

History
The minor district (king amphoe) was created on 17 July 1973, when the three tambons Na Si, Ban Khok, and Na Di were split off from Na Klang district. It was upgraded to a full district on 25 March 1979. In 1993 it was one of five districts of Udon Thani Province which formed the new province, Nong Bua Lamphu.

Geography
Neighboring districts are (from the south clockwise): Na Klang of Nong Bua Lamphu Province; Na Duang of Loei province; Nam Som, Ban Phue, and Kut Chap of Udon Thani province.

Administration
The district is divided into eight sub-districts (tambons), which are further subdivided into 92 villages (mubans). There are two townships (thesaban tambons): Suwannakhuha covers parts of tambons Suwannakhuha, Na Si, and Kut Phueng. Ban Khok covers parts of tambon Ban Khok. There are a further seven tambon administrative organizations (TAO).

References

External links
amphoe.com

Suwannakhuha